Crowntown is a hamlet on the B3303 road south of Nancegollan in west Cornwall, England. It is in the civil parish of Sithney.

References

Hamlets in Cornwall